"The Ocean" is a song by Swedish DJ and music producer Mike Perry, featuring vocals from Shy Martin. It was released as a digital download in Sweden on 15 April 2016. The song peaked at number 1 in Sweden, and reached the top 20 in Australia, Austria, Denmark, Finland, Germany, the Netherlands, Norway and Switzerland. The song has additionally peaked at number 39 in the UK. The song was performed by Perry during the Summerburst Festival at Ullevi in Gothenburg, Sweden.

Background
Mike Perry, whose real name is Mikael Persson, only produces music alongside his regular job, which is servicing Volvo diesel car engines in Skövde, Sweden. Although he had played "some gigs" before the song, he began receiving more offers after the song became a viral hit on Spotify, later playing the Summerburst Festival and a festival in Gärdet. Perry credited the song's "simple" and "no frills" nature as well as its "timely" sound as the reason for its success, saying that he prefers not to complicate the sound of songs he creates. The song was later placed in the Chill Hits playlist on Spotify, which helped it achieve chart success.

The vocalist and co-writer of the song, 23-year-old Sara Hjellström, who records under the alias Shy Martin, said she "did not think it would be a hit". Hjellström, originally part of the band Browsing Collection, co-wrote the song with her bandmate Nirob Islam from her current group, Södra Station. They also co-wrote the song "Summer Love" for the boy band FO&O.

As of November 2020, the music video, aired 2016-07-20, has been viewed 154 million times on YouTube, and the audio-only version published on 2016-06-03 on the promotion channel Tropical House Records additional 100 million times.

Track listing

Chart performance

Weekly charts

Year-end charts

Certifications

Awards and nominations

Release date

References

Songs about oceans and seas
2016 singles
2016 songs
Number-one singles in Sweden
Tropical house songs
Songs written by Shy Martin